Afanasijs Kuzmins (born 22 March 1947) is a Latvian shooter who won two Olympic medals in the 25 m Rapid Fire Pistol event; gold at the 1988 for the USSR and silver at the 1992 Summer Olympics for Latvia. He also won the 1986 World Championship in 25 m Standard Pistol. Kuzmins trained at the Armed Forces sports society in Riga.

He competed at the 2004 Summer Olympics and, by receiving wild card, competed also in the 2008 Summer Olympics. At the age of 61 Kuzmins finished 13th overall in his eighth Olympic appearance. No other shooter has appeared at eight Olympics; four have appeared at seven Olympics.

Aged 65, he competed at his ninth Olympic Games at the 2012 Summer Olympics finishing 17th.

Olympic results

World records

See also
 List of athletes with the most appearances at Olympic Games

References

External links
 
 
 

1947 births
Living people
Soviet male sport shooters
Latvian male sport shooters
ISSF pistol shooters
Shooters at the 1976 Summer Olympics
Shooters at the 1980 Summer Olympics
Shooters at the 1988 Summer Olympics
Shooters at the 1992 Summer Olympics
Shooters at the 1996 Summer Olympics
Shooters at the 2000 Summer Olympics
Shooters at the 2004 Summer Olympics
Shooters at the 2008 Summer Olympics
Shooters at the 2012 Summer Olympics
Olympic shooters of the Soviet Union
Olympic shooters of Latvia
Olympic gold medalists for the Soviet Union
Olympic silver medalists for Latvia
People from Daugavpils Municipality
Olympic medalists in shooting
Medalists at the 1992 Summer Olympics
Medalists at the 1988 Summer Olympics
Recipients of the Order of Friendship of Peoples
Honoured Masters of Sport of the USSR